Flower of Paris (French:Fleur de Paris) is a 1916 French silent film directed by André Hugon and starring Mistinguett, Harry Baur and Louis Paglieri.

Synopsis 
The tribulations of Margot, a poor seamstress who admires Mistinguett.

Cast
 Mistinguett as Margot Panard et Mistinguett  
 Harry Baur as Harry Podge  
 Louis Paglieri
 Guita Dauzon 
 Marc Gérard

References

Bibliography
 Rège, Philippe. Encyclopedia of French Film Directors, Volume 1. Scarecrow Press, 2009.

External links

1916 films
Films directed by André Hugon
French silent feature films
French black-and-white films
1910s French films